Pine Hill Airport could refer to:
Pine Hill Airport (New York), an active airport
Pine Hill Airport (Massachusetts), an inactive airport